Irvine Bell Frew (August 16, 1907 – April 2, 1995) was a Scottish-born Canadian ice hockey defenceman who played three seasons in the National Hockey League, for the Montreal Maroons, St. Louis Eagles and Montreal Canadiens between 1933 and 1936. The rest of his career, which lasted from 1926 to 1941, was spent in various minor leagues. As a junior player he won the 1926 Memorial Cup with the Calgary Canadians. Frew was born in Kilsyth, Scotland, but grew up in Calgary, Alberta.

Career statistics

Regular season and playoffs

See also
List of National Hockey League players from the United Kingdom

External links

1907 births
1995 deaths
Buffalo Bisons (IHL) players
Calgary Tigers players
Canadian ice hockey defencemen
Cleveland Indians (IHL) players
Montreal Canadiens players
Montreal Maroons players
People from Kilsyth
Quebec Castors players
St. Louis Eagles players
St. Louis Flyers (AHA) players
British emigrants to Canada
Ice hockey people from Calgary
Springfield Indians players